Belkacem Zobiri (born 23 October 1983 in Gap) is a retired French-Algerian footballer and current manager of US Veynes/Serres.

Club career
Zobiri started off his career in the junior ranks of local club Gap FC. In 2003, he was promoted to the first team and remained at the club for four more seasons. In 2007, he left Gap to join Louhans-Cuiseaux in the Championnat National. In two seasons with the club, he made 72 appearances, scoring 15 goals.

On 9 July 2009 Zobiri signed a two-year contract with Algerian club ES Sétif. However, he left the club after just one season after failing to become a regular.

On 6 June 2010 Zobiri returned to France and signed with the Championnat National side Amiens SC. He was released in May 2012.

Coaching career
Arriving at AC Amiens in 2015, Zobiri took charge of the club's U18 team. 34-year old Zobiri retired at the end of the 2017-18 season and became assistant manager of AC Amiens alongside his U18-manager position. In the summer 2019, he was appointed manager of US Veynes/Serres.

References

External links
 
 
 

1983 births
Living people
Algerian footballers
French footballers
French sportspeople of Algerian descent
Gap HAFC players
Louhans-Cuiseaux FC players
ES Sétif players
Amiens SC players
USL Dunkerque players
AS Cannes players
CS Constantine players
AC Amiens players
Ligue 2 players
Championnat National players
Championnat National 2 players
Championnat National 3 players
Algerian Ligue Professionnelle 1 players
Association football midfielders